"Polish tribes" is a term used sometimes to describe the tribes of West Slavic Lechites that lived from around the mid-6th century in the territories that became Polish with the creation of the Polish state by the Piast dynasty. The territory on which they lived became a part of the first Polish state created by duke Mieszko I and expanded at the end of the 10th century, enlarged further by conquests of king Bolesław I at the beginning of the 11th century. 

In about 850 AD a list of peoples was written down by the Bavarian Geographer. Absent on the list are Lechitic-speaking Polans, Pomeranians and Masovians, who became known later and were written about by Nestor the Chronicler in his Primary Chronicle (11th/12th century).

The most important tribes who were conquered by Polans were the Masovians, Vistulans, Silesians and Pomeranians. These five tribes "shared fundamentally common culture and language and were considerably more closely related to one another than were the Germanic tribes."

Ethnonym
The name "Poland" is derived from the most powerful of the tribes — the Polans. Their name, in turn, derives from the word pole — field. It was also used for the eastern Polans, a perhaps unrelated East Slavic tribe that lived in the region of the Dnieper River in Eastern Europe.

Religion
The Polish tribes were polytheistic pagans and worshiped a pantheon of numerous deities, each representing a different but equally important aspect of life for the Early Slavs - such as Perun, god of lightning. Little is known about what their religion was really like, but the limited archaeological evidence as well as remnants of pagan beliefs that have survived in the folklore of Slavic countries show many similarities between the faith of Polish tribes and that of other Early Medieval Slavic societies leading historians to believe that a common Slavic mythology exists between all Slavic branches.

Organization
The tribes were organized on the basis of kinship groups. A tribe's territory was divided into opoles, which constituted a group of neighboring settlements. 

Most members of a particular tribe were yeoman peasants, although a small group of aristocrats (nobiles or potentiores) was usually present.

Tribes
The following is the list of Polish tribes that inhabited the lands of Poland in the early Middle Ages, at the beginning of the Polish state. They shared fundamentally common culture and language and together they formed what is now Polish ethnicity and the culture of Poland. This process is called ethnic consolidation in which several ethnic communities of kindred origin and cognate languages, merge into a single one.

The following Slavic tribes are considered as Polish:
Polans
Pomeranians
Pyrzyczanie
Wolinianie
Goplans
Lendians 
Masovians
Vistulans
Silesians
Bieżuńczanie
Bobrzanie
Dziadoszanie
Golęszyce
Lubuszanie
Opolanie
Ślężanie
Trzebowianie

See also
Lechitic languages
Polish language

References

Further reading

External links
West Slavic tribes between 800 and 950, Polish tribes marked in pink

West Slavic tribes
Early medieval Poland